Dovydas Redikas (born 11 December 1992) is a Lithuanian professional basketball player.

Professional career
On 13 September 2018 Redikas joined Apollon Limassol of the Cypriot League.

National team career
Redikas won five gold medals with Lithuania's junior national teams. He gold medals at the following tournaments: the 2007 European Youth Under-15 Summer Olympic Festival, the 2008 FIBA Europe Under-16 Championship, the 2010 FIBA Europe Under-18 Championship, the 2011 FIBA Under-19 World Cup, and the 2012 FIBA Europe Under-20 Championship.

References

External links
 FIBA Profile
 Euroleague.net Profile
 Eurobasket.com Profile
 Dovydas Redikas VTB-League.com 

1992 births
Living people
Apollon Limassol BC players
Arkadikos B.C. players
BC Rytas players
BC Pieno žvaigždės players
Larisa B.C. players
Lithuanian expatriate basketball people in France
Lithuanian men's basketball players
People from Kuršėnai
Shooting guards